The Royalists (French: Les Chouans) is a 1947 French historical drama film directed by Henri Calef and starring Paul Amiot, Roland Armontel and Roger Bontemps. It is an adaptation of Honoré de Balzac's  1829 novel Les Chouans.

A later film version, titled Chouans! (1988), was directed by Philippe de Broca.

Plot

Cast
 Jean Marais: the Marquis of Montauran
 Madeleine Robinson: Madam du Gua
 Madeleine Lebeau: Marie-Nathalie de Verneuil
 Marcel Herrand: Corentin
 Pierre Dux: Hulot
 Paul Amiot: the Count of Beauvent
 Roland Armontel: Beau Pied
 Jean Brochard: Marche à Terre
 Guy Favières: Galope Chopine
 Georges Paulais: the Marquis of Guénic
 Jacques Charon: Lieutenant Merle
 Louis Seigner: the priest Gudin
 Léo Lapara: Pille-Miche
 Howard Vernon: Capitain Gérard

Bibliography
 Oscherwitz,Dayna & Higgins, MaryEllen. The A to Z of French Cinema. Scarecrow Press, 2009.

References

External links

1940s historical drama films
1947 films
Films based on French novels
Films based on works by Honoré de Balzac
Films directed by Henri Calef
French historical drama films
1940s French-language films
French Revolution films
French black-and-white films
Films scored by Joseph Kosma
1940s French films